Oingo Boingo is an EP by American new wave band Oingo Boingo, released in 1980.

Background
The EP was originally recorded as a promotional record—known as the Demo EP—distributed by the band on 10-inch vinyl prior to being signed by a record label. It was largely produced by Michael Boshears, with the exception of "Only a Lad", produced by Jo Julian. It was limited to a total of 130 copies, with each sleeve hand-painted by the band's team.

The EP was then picked up by I.R.S. Records and released publicly as the Oingo Boingo EP, with the track "Forbidden Zone" (recorded for the then-unreleased movie of the same name) replaced by a ska-inflected cover of Willie Dixon's "Violent Love". An edited version of "Forbidden Zone" was later released on the film's soundtrack album, but the complete original recording, as included on the Demo EP, has never been re-released.

Like the Demo EP, Oingo Boingo was also initially issued on 10-inch vinyl, but was later reissued on 12-inch vinyl and cassette. The reissue replaced "Ain't This the Life" with a new recording. The song "Only a Lad" was subsequently re-recorded for the band's first album, Only a Lad (1981).

The cover features an illustration of a cat by artist Louis Wain.

Track listing

All songs written by Danny Elfman, except "Violent Love", by Willie Dixon.

Side one
Only a Lad – 4:18
Violent Love – 2:38

Side two
Ain't This the Life – 3:30
I'm So Bad – 3:56

Personnel
Oingo Boingo
Danny Elfman – lead vocals
Steve Bartek – guitars
Kerry Hatch – bass guitar
Johnny "Vatos" Hernandez – drums
Leon Schneiderman – baritone and alto saxophones
Sam "Sluggo" Phipps – tenor and soprano saxophones
Dale Turner – trumpet, trombone

Additional musicians
David Eagle – drums (12-inch version of "Ain't This the Life") 

Technical
Michael Boshears – producer, engineer; mixing ("Only a Lad")
Jo Julian – producer ("Only a Lad")

References

1980 debut EPs
Oingo Boingo EPs
I.R.S. Records EPs